Kaotiko is a punk group originate of Basque country.

History 
The band was formed at the end of 1999 in Salvatierra. Three of its members (Aguayo, Fonta and Aguayiko) come from the group Kaos Etiliko. In September 2001 they released their first album, "Mundo kaotiko". In April 2003 was published their second disc "Raska y pierde". With these two discs, on 17 April decided to record a DVD at the Azkena room of Vitoria, that finally published on 14 March.
With a new label come, "Destino escrito". In this disk collaborate "el drogas" (Barricada) in the songs "Abuso" and "Correre". La Miki, singer of No Relax, collaborated on second voice in "Recuerdo". The album is recorded in the studies Katarain, in Azkarate, between December 2005 and January 2006.

On 21 February 2008, Kaotiko published his fifth job, "Adrenalina", with the Oihuka label. This album contain the collaboration of Evaristo (La Polla, Gatillazo) and  Banda Bassotti  with them they recorded the theme "Luna Rossa".

In 2010 they released their album "Reacciona", with the record company "Baga-Biga".

Their last album is called "E.H Calling", they published in 2013. The Clash  as regards for the title, paraphrasing "London calling", the group regressed with their sixth work. This is the first time that they have been so long without new material. They were used to produce two song per year, but this time they have been three years without producing anything. They come back with the same members, the same discography Baga-Biga. They introduced their album like an absolute renewal, due to they changed the sound and the content comparing with the works which they had done before. Thanks to the production of Jimmy from  Soziedad Alkoholika has known how to harden the material without losing the essence of accessibility, choruses and melodies.

Members 
Fonta: bass and choirs
Aguayo: guitar
Jony: voice
Aguayiko: guitar and choirs
Xabi: drums and choirs

Discography

Mundo kaotiko 
Published in 2001 with the record company Oihuka.

Raska y pierde 
Published in 2003 with the record company  Oihuka.

Directo 
Published in 2005 with the record company GOR Discos.

Destino escrito 
Published in 2006 with the record company Universal Music.

Adrenalina 
Published in 2008 with the record company Oihuka.

Reacciona 
Published in 2010 with the record company Baga-Biga.

E.H. Calling 
Published in 2013 with the record company Baga-Biga.

References

Basque musicians
Spanish punk rock groups